Sakhteman-e Rayisi (also Romanized as Sākhtemān Rayīsī; also known as Reesī) is a village in Dadenjan Rural District, Meymand District, Firuzabad County, Fars Province, Iran. At the 2006 census, its population was 134, in 25 families.

References 

Populated places in Firuzabad County